Douglas Norman LaBelle II (born January 19, 1975) is an American professional golfer.

LaBelle played on the Nationwide Tour/Web.com Tour from 2003–06, 2009–12. He has also played on the Canadian Tour from 1999 to 2002 and the PGA Tour of Australasia from 2000 to 2002. He qualified for the 2007 PGA Tour season by finishing 15th on the Nationwide Tour money list in 2006. He played on the PGA Tour in 2007, 2008, 2013, and 2014.

Professional wins (2)

Web.com Tour wins (2)

Results in major championships

CUT = missed the half-way cut
"T" = tied
Note: LaBelle never played in the Masters Tournament or the PGA Championship.

Results in The Players Championship

CUT = missed the half-way cut

U.S. national team appearances
Amateur
 Palmer Cup: 1998 (tie)

See also
 2006 Nationwide Tour graduates
 2012 Web.com Tour graduates

External links
 
 

American male golfers
New Mexico Lobos men's golfers
PGA Tour golfers
Korn Ferry Tour graduates
Golfers from Michigan
Golfers from Scottsdale, Arizona
People from Mount Pleasant, Michigan
1975 births
Living people